Hervé Touré (born 25 February 1982) is a French professional basketball player who currently plays for Guaros de Lara in Venezuela. After starting his career with Asvel Basket, he goes to play in Belgium, Italy and Spain for almost eight years. Then he returned to France in 2012 to emigrate again playing successively in Iran, Lebanon, Argentina and Venezuela where he will cumulate the national and international title of South American League in 2017.

Touré is international with the France team. At 204 cm, he plays the small forward and power forward positions.
He is the author of two books written in French dealing with media

References

External links
 Hervé Touré at acb.com
 Hervé Touré at lnb.fr
 Hervé Touré at legabasket.it
 Herve Toure at Fiba.com

1982 births
Living people
ASVEL Basket players
CB Valladolid players
Centers (basketball)
Élan Béarnais players
Élan Chalon players
French men's basketball players
Liga ACB players
New Basket Brindisi players
Olimpia Milano players
Pallacanestro Cantù players
Pallacanestro Virtus Roma players
Metropolitans 92 players
Power forwards (basketball)
SLUC Nancy Basket players
Spirou Charleroi players
Sportspeople from Lyon